The 1972 Boise State Broncos football team represented Boise State College during the 1972 NCAA College Division football season, the fifth season of Bronco football (at the four-year level) and the third as members of the Big Sky Conference and NCAA. In the College Division, they played their home games on campus at Bronco Stadium in Boise, Idaho.

The conference losses were the last until 1976.

Schedule

NFL Draft
One Bronco was selected in the 1973 NFL Draft, which lasted seventeen rounds (442 selections).

References

Boise State
Boise State Broncos football seasons
Boise State Broncos football